Samiya Mirza (born 17 January 1988) is a Pakistani elite trekker. She is the first female elite trekker to attempt Khurdopin pass, the highest pass of the Karakoram range, in the winter of 2016.

Climbing career
Samiya began her climbing activity in the Northern Pakistan. In 2016 she attempted to ascent an unclimbed peak (6200 meter/20,341 ft) in the vicinity of Khurodpin pass. She and Qudrat ali pushed on up through the pass, which is the highest pass in the Karakorum mountain range at 5790 meters (18,996 ft). The expedition began on December 24, 2016 and concluded on January 6, 2017.

Milestone achieved
2017 - High Altitude Marathon Khunjerab Pass - 24 May

References

External links 
Samiya_Rafiq's Blog

1988 births
Pakistani mountain climbers
Living people
People from Riyadh
Pakistani social workers